The Centralia Massacre may refer to:

 Centralia Massacre (Missouri), an event in Missouri during the American Civil War in 1864
 Centralia Massacre (Washington), an incident of labor unrest in Washington State in 1919